Legendary Comics is an American comic book publisher founded in 2010. The company is owned by Legendary Entertainment, a media company located in Burbank, California. The company publishes both original works and licensed ones based on films produced by Legendary Pictures.

History 
Legendary Entertainment first announced the launch of its comic book division, Legendary Comics, in 2010 with the appointment of editor-in-chief Bob Schreck and editor Greg Tumbarello. The first graphic novel published by the company was Holy Terror by Frank Miller, which was released in 2011 as the #1 graphic novel and immediately launched the division as a top ten comics publisher. Pacific Rim: Tales from Year Zero was a #1 New York Times Best Seller, Godzilla: Awakening was a New York Times Best Seller, and Annihilator by Grant Morrison & Frazer Irving was nominated for an Eisner Award. In 2020, the company published an adaptation of Bram Stoker's 1897 Dracula novel, which used the likeness of Bela Lugosi, the lead actor in the 1931 film from Universal Pictures.

Bibliography

Graphic novels and collections 
Legendary Comics has published several original graphic novels and collections of serialized works.

Uncollected series 
 The Harvester (February 2015 – October 2015, #1–9, story by Brandon Seifert, art by Eric Battle, colors by Lee Loughridge, letters by Sean Konot, cover colors by Dominic Regan)
 The Tower Chronicles: Fellquest (October 2015 – February 2017, #1–12, story by Matt Wagner, pencils by Simon Bisley, colors by Ryan Brown)

References 

2010 establishments in California
Book publishing companies based in California
Comic book publishing companies of the United States
Companies based in Burbank, California
American companies established in 2010
Privately held companies based in California
Dalian Wanda Group